The Florisbad Skull is an important human fossil of the early Middle Stone Age, representing either late Homo heidelbergensis or early Homo sapiens. 
It was discovered in 1932 by T. F. Dreyer at the Florisbad site,  Free State Province, South Africa.

Classification
The Florisbad Skull was classified as Homo (Africanthropus) helmei by Dreyer (1935), after the sponsor of Dreyer's expedition,  R. E. Helme. The Africanthropus generic name proposed by Dreyer was taken up by Weinert (1938) to refer to early African human fossils. In a note to Dreyer's 1935 publication, C. U. Ariëns Kappers mentioned the close resemblance of the fossil to Homo sapiens fossilis (Cro-Magnon Man). M. R. Drennan (1935, 1937) emphasized resemblance to Homo neanderthalensis, proposing his classification as Homo florisbadensis (helmei). A. Galloway (1937) proposed classification as Homo sapiens, specifically noting a resemblance to modern Australoids. Commentators of the 1950s to 1970s have drawn attention to archaic African human fossils such as Saldanha and Kabwe crania (now assigned to H. heidelbergensis). Clarke (1985) compared it to Laetoli Hominid 18 and Omo 2, which are now considered early anatomically modern human (H. sapiens) fossils.

The difficulty of placing the fossil in either H. heidelbergensis or H. sapiens prompted McBrearty and Brooks (2000) to revive the designation H. helmei.  In 2016 Chris Stringer argued that the Florisbad Skull, along with the Jebel Irhoud and Eliye Springs specimens, belong to an archaic or "early" form of Homo sapiens. The Florisbad Skull was also classified as Homo sapiens by Hublin et al. (in 2017), in part on the basis of the similar Jebel Irhoud finds from Morocco. Scerri et al. (2018) adduce the fossil as evidence for "African multiregionalism", the view of a complex speciation of H. sapiens widely dispersed across Africa, with substantial hybridization between H. sapiens and more divergent hominins in different regions. Lahr and Mounier (2019) also classify the Florisbad Skull as an example of early H. sapiens, which they suggest arose between 350,000 and 260,000 years ago from the merging of populations in East and South Africa.

Description
The Florisbad Skull belonged to a specimen within the size range of modern humans, with a brain volume larger than modern averages, at 1,400 cm3. The skull was also found with Middle Stone Age tools.

The fossil skull is a fragment, preserved are the right side of the face, most of the frontal bone, and some of the maxilla, along with portions of the roof and sidewalls. A single, upper right, third molar was also found with the adult skull.

The skull also showed extensive porotic hyperostosis as well as a large number of healed lesions, including pathological drainage or vascular tracts. There are also a couple of large puncture marks and scratch-like marks which may reflect hyena chewing.
 

Context 

The partial cranium is part of an assemblage of mostly carnivore prey remains, caught in vertical spring vents. It shows damage by hyena chewing. The spring vents were later sealed by deposits. "Peat II" is a  deposit  of dark organic clay representing a Middle Stone Age land surface, showing a human occupation horizon dated .

The wider Florisbad site has also produced a large and diverse fauna. The assemblage including micro-vertebrates from springhares, rabbits, rodents and reptiles has informed researchers on the paleoenvironment of the interior of South Africa in the Middle Pleistocene. The large mammal component of the site  suggests an open grassland with a body of water in the immediate vicinity. Although many specimens are dated by comparisons of faunal assemblages, this method does not prove to have accurate chronological resolution for much of the last million years.

See also
 List of human evolution fossils
 Middle Stone Age

References

External links
 Human Timeline (Interactive) – Smithsonian, National Museum of Natural History (August 2016).

Homo fossils
Homo sapiens fossils
1932 archaeological discoveries